Jerry Buhlmann, born 26 November 1959, is Chairman of Dept BV, Senior Independent Director of Inchcape PLC, Chairman of Croud Limited, Chairman of Hybrid Limited, member of the Supervisory Board of Serviceplan GmbH and previously CEO Aegis Group PLC.  He was also the chief executive officer of Dentsu Aegis Network.

Early life 
Jerry Buhlmann was born in London on 26 November 1959.

Career 
Buhlmann started his career in advertising in the 1980s at Young & Rubicam and WCRS. In 1989, he was one of three founders of BBJ, a specialist media agency in the UK, building the business until it was acquired by Aegis Group PLC in 1999. From 2000, Jerry held a number of senior positions within Aegis Group PLC until 2010 when he was appointed Chief Executive. Following the merger of Aegis Group PLC with Dentsu Inc. in 2013, Jerry was appointed CEO of Dentsu Aegis Network. Jerry stepped down from the position of Chief Executive at the end of 2018 after nine years.

Buhlmann currently holds the following positions:

Non-executive Director, then Senior Independent Director for Inchcape PLC (since 2017).

Senior Advisor to management consultants OC&C (since March 2019).

Chairman of Croud Limited – a private equity funded digital marketing agency (since January 2020).

Chairman of Hybrid – a digital higher education marketing specialist (since June 2021).

Supervisory Board Member of Serviceplan Group, a Munich based international advertising agency group, (since October 2021) | https://www.serviceplan.com/en/news/new-supervisory-board-member.html

Chairman of Dept – an international digital agency (since April 2022).

Personal life

Buhlmann lives between London and Surrey and has three children.

References

British chief executives
1959 births
Living people